Mel Purcell and Stan Smith were the defending champions but lost in the quarterfinals to Wojciech Fibak and Sandy Mayer.

Fibak and Mayer won in the final 6–4, 6–4 against Heinz Günthardt and Balázs Taróczy.

Seeds

  Heinz Günthardt /  Balázs Taróczy (final)
  Henri Leconte /  Pavel Složil (semifinals)
  Wojciech Fibak /  Sandy Mayer (champions)
  Jan Gunnarsson /  Michael Mortensen (first round)

Draw

External links
 1984 Fischer-Grand Prix Doubles draw

Doubles